Nick Duigan  (born 7 September 1984) is a former professional Australian rules footballer who played for the Carlton Football Club in the Australian Football League (AFL).

Background
Originally from South Australia, Duigan grew up supporting the Adelaide Crows and playing junior football for Pembroke School in Adelaide and also was a junior player at the Walkerville Football Club. Throughout his junior career, he was troubled by injuries and had a hard time stringing a series of games together until after the age of twenty.

Duigan is a registered psychologist; throughout his early 20s, Duigan studied psychology at university, and by the end of 2010, then aged 26, Duigan had completed his master's degree in psychology. During the same period, Duigan played football semi-professionally for the Norwood Football Club in the South Australian National Football League (SANFL), primarily as a defender. He appeared in a total of 87 senior games for the Redlegs during that time, and was the club's vice-captain in 2010. He finished tenth in the 2010 Magarey Medal, and kicked the game-winning goal in Norwood's come-from-behind preliminary final victory against the Eagles.

Duigan is the son of former South Australian Member of Parliament for the seat of Adelaide, Michael Duigan.

AFL career
Duigan left Norwood at the end of 2010, intending to travel to Sudan for a year to do volunteer work. However, he also nominated for the AFL draft, and was drafted by the Carlton Football Club with its fifth selection (#70 overall). The selection surprised many, as it was very rare at the time for a player as old as Duigan (26), and without previous AFL experience, to be drafted. Duigan was given guernsey number 34.

Playing in defence, Duigan impressed for the Blues during the pre-season, and he made his senior AFL debut in the club's first round match against Richmond. He immediately became a regular in the Carlton backline in the 2011, and was noted for both his ability and his courage. He played twenty-two games for the year and won Carlton's Best First Year Player award. He played sixteen matches in 2012.

In 2013, Duigan was elevated to the club's five-man leadership group, however struggled to retain his place in the team on form, playing only three home-and-away matches for the year. He was famously brought into Carlton's elimination final team as an emergency after Brock McLean was injured at the very end of the warm-up, and kicked four goals as Carlton overcame a 32-point deficit to defeat  in front of a record crowd of 94,690.

Duigan had intended to continue playing in 2014, but after struggling with an ongoing knee injury during the first month of the pre-season, he announced his retirement on 9 December 2013.

Post-AFL career
In 2014, Duigan moved Geraldton, Western Australia to take a role with mental health services provider Youth Focus. He also took a role as coach, with ambitions to play should his knee heal sufficiently, with the Towns Football Club in the Great Northern Football League.

References

External links

Australian rules footballers from South Australia
1984 births
Living people
Carlton Football Club players
Norwood Football Club players
Preston Football Club (VFA) players
People educated at Pembroke School, Adelaide